The United States–China talks in Alaska, also referred to as the Alaska talks or the Anchorage meetings, were a series of meetings between representatives of China and the United States to discuss a range of issues affecting their relations. The talks took place in three rounds during a two-day period between March 18 and 19 of 2021. They took place at the Captain Cook Hotel in Anchorage, Alaska. Some American officials who attended the talks include Secretary of State Antony Blinken and National Security Advisor Jake Sullivan. Some Chinese officials who attended the talks include Yang Jiechi, a member of the Politburo, and foreign minister Wang Yi. Most of the talks took place behind closed doors.

Following the first day of the talks, both sides publicly denounced each other to the media. After the second day, some agreements were made, and the talks were called constructive, as well as substantive.

Background 
Preceding the talks, diplomatic relations between China and the United States were strained due to differing positions on trade, cyber espionage and human rights issues. In the week before the talks, the Biden administration did the following: met with South Korea to reaffirm their alliance, imposed sanctions on senior Chinese officials along with the UK, the EU and Canada, and met with the other members of Quadrilateral Security Dialogue. Barry Pavel of the Atlantic Council mentioned that this sequence of meetings in advance of the US–China meeting was to show the approach of the Biden administration: consulting with allies and partners, presenting a united front, and countering what he calls China's tactic "to pick countries off one by one, as part of a divide-and-conquer strategy".

Anchorage was chosen as the city due to it being the mid-point between China and the United States, which acts as a refueling station between the two countries. Pang Zhongying—an international relations specialist at Nankai University—said that holding the meeting there, midway between Beijing and Washington, showed "goodwill", but that "it is already very difficult for the two sides to have this meeting just 50 days after Biden came into office". 

Prior to the event, the talks were portrayed in the Chinese media as a move towards détente with the United States, following the end of the Trump administration. The Chinese reportedly hoped to use the talks to negotiate an end to Trump era trade restrictions.

Prior to the talks, the United States stated that the meeting was going to be a one-off event that would be used to air a "long list of [U.S.] concerns" with China.

Talks 

The first day of talks were noted for ending in mutual public denunciations by both sides. The Chinese representatives accused the United States of "condescension and hypocrisy", whilst the Americans accused the Chinese of "threatening the rule-based order that maintains global stability" and launching an "assault on basic values", such as democracy and human rights. Yang Jiechi responded by stating "that it is important for the United States to change its own image and to stop advancing its own democracy in the rest of the world." Yang went on to say that the United States and its allies did not represent global public opinion and accused the United States of being a global leader in cyber espionage. Both sides accused the other of breaking diplomatic protocol.

The conference ended on the second day without any joint statements. The Americans agreed to continue to uphold the one-China principle, whilst also stating that the issue of Taiwan was one that the American government was "fundamentally at odds" with the Chinese government. However, both sides agreed on the value of using the talks as an opportunity to hear and better understand each other's issues and to continue cooperation on issues related to climate change. The Chinese representatives told the media that the talks were "direct, frank, and constructive" while also affirming their commitment to "safeguard [their] national sovereignty". The American representatives stated that the talks were "substantive, serious, and direct". Both sides agreed to maintain open channels for continued dialogue and communication.

After the meeting, Blinken stated to the media that America's intention during the talks was to share "the significant concerns that we have about a number of the actions that China’s taken and the behavior it’s exhibiting—concerns shared by our allies and partners. And we did that. We also wanted to lay out very clearly our own policies, priorities, and worldview, and we did that too."

Issues discussed 
Issues publicly raised by the Americans included:

 Taiwanese security
 Alleged political suppression in Hong Kong
 Alleged persecution of Uyghurs in Xinjiang
 Alleged Chinese espionage in the United States, such as the 2021 Microsoft Exchange Server data breach
 Alleged economic coercion of American allies such as Australia.
 Alleged military coercion of American allies and partners by China.

Issues publicly raised by the Chinese included:

 Alleged interference in China's internal affairs under the guise of human rights issues, such as in Hong Kong, Xinjiang and Tibet.
 Adherence to the one-China principle
 Alleged double standards on counter-terrorism with regards to governance in Xinjiang.
 Trade sanctions and tariffs imposed during and after the China–United States trade war
Accusations of the United States being hypocritical on race relations and human rights by bringing up Black Lives Matter protests.
 Alleged presence of a "Cold War mentality" within the American government when dealing with China.
Canadian prime minister Justin Trudeau stated that he was confident that the American delegation would bring up the detention of Michael Spavor and Michael Kovrig as a topic of discussion with their Chinese interlocutors at the talks.

Impact 

Chinese state-owned media such as the Global Times and People's Daily described the talks as historic for marking a change in power relations between the two countries. This was due to the Chinese refusal to accept that the United States could, from the Chinese perspective, negotiate from a position of power. The Australian-American publication The Diplomat wrote that the Chinese were likely trying to permanently change America's negotiating posture with China by signaling that China would no longer accept any direct criticism and now demanded respect in the context of a new type of great power relations. The conservative American publication The National Interest stated that China likely got the "wrong message" from the meeting by showing no recognition that the American negotiators were also representing the interests and concerns of America's allies. The Washington Post stated that the talks shattered any "illusions of a reset in U.S.-China relations" following the end of the Trump administration.

In China, the talks increased anti-American nationalism with merchandise quoting statements made by Yang and Wang at the talks reportedly selling well.

The Alaska meeting was followed two days later by a visit to China from Russian foreign minister Sergey Lavrov, which was widely viewed as a sign of strengthening Chinese–Russian relations. The visit, which the Chinese framed as a response to US "encirclement," included a discussion of moving away from use of the US dollar in trade.

See also 
China–United States relations
Wolf warrior diplomacy
Thought and Foreign policy of Xi Jinping
Senior Dialogue, Strategic Economic Dialogue, U.S.–China Strategic and Economic Dialogue

References

2021 in Alaska
March 2021 events in the United States
China–United States relations
History of Anchorage, Alaska
Presidency of Joe Biden